Xiuning County is a county in the south of Anhui Province, People's Republic of China, under the jurisdiction of the prefecture-level city of Huangshan City. The government of Xiuning County is located in Haiyang Town.

Xiuning County has jurisdiction over nine towns and twelve townships.

Administrative divisions
Xiuning County is divided to 10 towns and 11 townships.
Towns

Townships

History and culture
Xiuning County is historically renowned for producing more zhuàngyuán (: the scholar with the highest score in the national Imperial examination), than any other place in China. Accordingly, the large public space in Haiyang Town is called Zhuangyuan Square.

In 2009, the Xiuning County People's Government unveiled a monument commemorating the 1800th anniversary of Xiuning (208-2008).

Climate

Western attention
In 2003, the Peabody Essex Museum, in Salem, Massachusetts, completed a 200 million dollar renovation and expansion, designed by architect Moshe Safdie, moving a 200-year-old 16-room Chinese house from Xiuning County to the grounds of the Museum. While in China this house was home to many generations who made a living in traveling to Shanghai and running a pawn brokers business (as stated by the movie shown at the Peabody Essex Museum after exiting Yin Yu Tang House).

In early 2008, the BBC broadcast a series of 5 documentaries on the life of pupils at schools in China. Called "Chinese School", the three schools documented were all located in Xiuning County: Xiuning High School, the top school in the county; Haiyang Middle/High School; and Ping Min Elementary School. This series was shown on BBC 4 and was received with mixed reactions, most of which were positive.

Transportation

Rail
Xiuning is served by the Anhui–Jiangxi Railway.

Tourist attractions
Dengfeng Bridge is a historic stone arch bridge in the county.

References

External links

Xiuning County Government 
Yin Yu Tang at the Peabody Essex Museum's website

 
County-level divisions of Anhui
Huangshan City